Pleuropogon is a genus of Arctic and North American plants in the grass family known generally as semaphore grass.

Pleuropogon native primarily to North America, with one species extending into Arctic Eurasia. These are erect grasses with drooping leaves. They grow in wet areas, sometimes even to the point of being partially submerged at times.

 Species
 Pleuropogon californicus  (Nees) Benth. ex Vasey - annual semaphore grass - California (from San Luis Obispo Co to Humboldt Co)
 Pleuropogon davyi L.D.Benson - northwestern California
 Pleuropogon hooverianus (G.T.Benson) Howell - North Coast semaphore grass - California  (Mendocino, Sonoma, Marin Cos)
 Pleuropogon oregonus Chase - Oregon semaphore grass - Oregon (Lake + Union Cos)
 Pleuropogon refractus  (A.Gray) Benth. ex Vasey - nodding semaphore grass - California (Del Norte, Humboldt, Mendocino, Marin Cos), Oregon, Washington, British Columbia
 Pleuropogon sabinii R.Br.  false semaphore grass - Svalbard, Greenland, Nunavut, Yukon, Northwest Territories, Ontario, Quebec, Labrador, Alaska, northern regions of Russian Federation

References

Pooideae
Poaceae genera